Burditt is a surname. Notable people with the surname include:

Albert Burditt (born 1972), American basketball player
George Burditt (lawyer) (1922–2013), American lawyer and politician
George Burditt (writer) (1923–2013), American screenwriter
Jack Burditt, American screenwriter and son of George Burditt
Ken Burditt (1906–1977), English footballer
Whitney Kroenke Burditt (born 1977), American film producer and philanthropist